Pingasa rhadamaria is a moth of the family Geometridae first described by Achille Guenée in 1858. It is found on the Comoros, Madagascar and São Tomé and Príncipe and in Sierra Leone, South Africa, the Gambia, Zimbabwe, Cameroon, Ghana, Ethiopia, Kenya, Tanzania and Zambia.

The larvae feed on Ziziphus jujube and Ziziphus mauritiana.

Subspecies
Pingasa rhadamaria rhadamaria (Madagascar)
Pingasa rhadamaria alterata (Walker, 1860) (Kenya, South Africa)
Pingasa rhadamaria attenuans (Walker, 1860) (Sierra Leone, São Tomé, Gambia)
Pingasa rhadamaria signifrontaria (Mabille, 1893) (the Comoros)
Pingasa rhadamaria victoria Prout, 1913 (Zimbabwe)

References

Moths described in 1858
Pseudoterpnini
Moths of the Comoros
Moths of Africa
Moths of Madagascar